is a former Japanese football player. His older brother Kazuyoshi is also a former football player.

Playing career
Mikami was born in Saitama on February 13, 1980. After graduating from Komazawa University, he joined his local club Urawa Reds in J1 League in 2002. Although he played several matches as left side midfielder, he hardly played in matches until 2004. In June 2004, he moved to J2 League club Kyoto Purple Sanga (later Kyoto Sanga FC). He soon became a regular player as left side back. Sanga won the champions in 2005 season and was promoted to J1. However his opportunity to play decreased from 2006 and Sanga was relegated to J2 a year later. In 2008, he moved to J2 club Ehime FC. He played as regular left side back. However his opportunity to play decreased from 2010 and he retired at the end of the 2011 season.

Club statistics

References

External links

1980 births
Living people
Komazawa University alumni
Association football people from Saitama Prefecture
Japanese footballers
J1 League players
J2 League players
Urawa Red Diamonds players
Kyoto Sanga FC players
Ehime FC players
Association football defenders